NIAONiao Virtual Singer, is a freeware vocal synthesizer application built for Chinese and is the first singing vocal synthesizer made in China.

Overview
The software works similar to the Vocaloid software by Yamaha and another free shareware software called UTAU.

The default voicebank is named Yu Niaoniao (余袅袅), however additional voicebanks can be made manually to produce new vocals and additional languages are possible. The website for the software offers several other vocals for download.

The main samples are packed in a single large file. NIAONiao can have final consonants in a voice, since it is built for the Chinese language. There is a panel at the bottom for controlling parameters, pitchbends, and vibrato.

NIAONiao can import MIDI files, VSQX files, and UST files, export tracks as the "Niao" file format (*.nn), and can render vocal tracks directly as WAV, MP3, or MIDI files.

References

External links

Speech synthesis software
Singing software synthesizers